Walking is a 1961 Soviet drama film directed by Ivan Kavaleridze.

Plot 
The film tells about a peasant woman who goes to the city with the hope of improving her life...

Cast 
 Lyudmila Gurchenko
 Rita Gladunko
 Stepan Shkurat
 Anna Nikolayeva
 Nikolai Kozlenko
 Vasili Vekshin
 Leonid Danchishin
 Nikolai Pishvanov
 Pavel Shkryoba
 Georgiy Babenko

References

External links 
 

1961 films
1960s Russian-language films
Soviet drama films
Films based on works by Ukrainian writers
Films scored by Boris Lyatoshinsky